Acalolepta mixta is a species of beetle in the family Cerambycidae. It was described by Frederick William Hope in 1841, originally under the genus Monohammus. It is known from Australia, and was introduced to the Solomon Islands, Indonesia (Sulawesi, Sumbawa, Savu), Singapore and Vietnam. It feeds on Theobroma cacao, Adansonia digitata, Mangifera indica, Excoecaria agallocha, and Moringa oleifera.

References

Acalolepta
Beetles described in 1841